The Walensee,  also known as Lake Walen or Lake Walenstadt from Walenstadt, is one of the larger lakes in Switzerland, with about two thirds of its area in the Canton of St. Gallen and about one third in the Canton of Glarus. Other towns and villages at the lake include Weesen, Quinten, Quarten, and Murg.

The three main rivers leading to the lake are the Seez, Murgbach, and Linth. The last continues its course from Walensee to Lake Zurich. The Schnittlauchinsel, at the eastern end of the lake, is the only island in the Walensee.

The Churfirsten range raises steeply on the north side from the lake's level at 419 m to 2,306 m above sea level. On the south, the lake is overlooked by the Mürtschenstock Massif, whose peak is 2,441 m above sea level. The highest point of the lake's drainage basin is the Tödi (3,614 m).

The lake provided the inspiration for a solo piano piece by Hungarian Romantic composer Franz Liszt, Au lac de Wallenstadt. The piece is part of a collection of solo piano works inspired by his travels to Switzerland in the 1830s.

Gallery

References

External links

Waterlevels of Walensee at Murg
 

 
Walen
Lakes of the canton of Glarus
Lakes of the canton of St. Gallen
LWalensee
Glarus–St. Gallen border